F-statistic may refer to:
a statistic used for the F-test
a concept in biogenetics, see F-statistics